The 1970 Women's World Cup (Italian: Coppa del Mondo; sponsored name Martini & Rossi Cup) was an association football tournament organised by the Federation of Independent European Female Football (FIEFF) in Italy in July 1970. It featured women's teams from seven countries and is the first known tournament to be named as a women's football World Cup.

Matches were played in Genoa, Bologna, Milan, Bari, Salerno, Naples, and the third-place playoff and final were both in Turin.

The tournament was won by Denmark, represented by Boldklubben Femina.

The tournament
Eight teams were scheduled to appear in the tournament. The first list of participants, published in February 1970, consisted of Argentina, Denmark, France, Italy, Brazil, Czechoslovakia, England, and the Soviet Union. This was changed in a later revision, with West Germany, Mexico, Austria and Switzerland replacing Argentina, France, Brazil and the Soviet Union in May 1970. Czechoslovakia would have been the only country from Europe's Eastern Bloc to compete, but the team withdrew because of visa issues. 

The crowds for the tournament were "30,000-strong". Denmark won the tournament after beating Italy 2–0 in the final.

Teams were divided into the "northern" group (in Genoa, Bologna and Milan), and "southern" (Bari, Salerno, Naples) with the top teams meeting in the final.

The tournament did not involve FIFA, which had held the first men's World Cup in 1930 but did not hold any women's event until 1988. The host country's matches are considered official by the Italian Football Federation. The Italian women's league had been established in 1968.

Mexico, a losing semi-finalist 2–1 to Italy, were described as the "revelation" of the tournament.

Bracket

Quarter-finals

Czechoslovakia withdrew due to visa issues, and so West Germany were given a second chance instead.

Semi-finals

Third place play-off

Final

Memorials
Tournament memorabilia was collected at an exhibition in Pessione di Chieri (Turin) from June to August 2019.

Later tournaments
The tournament was followed by the 1971 Women's World Cup in Mexico, and the series of five Mundialito tournaments from 1981–1988 in Japan and Italy, before the 1988 FIFA Women's Invitation Tournament and 1991 FIFA Women's World Cup, both in China.

References

Bibliography
 

International women's association football invitational tournaments
International association football competitions hosted by Italy
Women's World Cup
Women's World Cup
July 1970 sports events in Europe